is a Japanese professional footballer who plays as a midfielder and currently play for SC Sagamihara.

Career 

Kinjo begin first youth career with Yamauchi JFC and JFA Academy Fukushima until 2014. Kinjo moved to Germany to defend the Munich club, TSV 1860 Munich as youth team for the 2015 to 2016 season, he later debut for reserve team in 2015 as TSV 1860 Munich II. Kinjo moved to Fortuna Düsseldorf II from 2016 as youth team. He debut as professional team in Düsseldorf, Fortuna Düsseldorf.

After abroad in Germany, Kincho return to Japan and joined to J2 club, Thespakusatsu Gunma in 17 August 2018 during mid season of J2 League. He leave from the club in 17 December 2021 after four years at Gunma been ended.

On 14 April 2022, Kinjo moved to Vonds Ichihara ahead for 2022 season. He left from the club in 2022 after a season at Ichihara.

On 17 December 2022, Kinjo announcement transfer to J3 club, SC Sagamihara has been officially confirmed for upcoming 2023 season after he leave from Vonds Ichihara at end of the 2022 season.

Personal life

Toshiki Kinjo was born in Japan, and holds American citizenship through descent. Toshiki Kinjo is the younger brother of former footballer, Christopher Tatsuki Kinjo.

Career statistics

Club
.

Notes

References

External links

 

Living people
1997 births
Association football midfielders
Association football people from Okinawa Prefecture
Japanese footballers
American soccer players
Japanese people of American descent
American sportspeople of Japanese descent
Fortuna Düsseldorf players
2. Bundesliga players
J2 League players
J3 League players
Thespakusatsu Gunma players
SC Sagamihara players
Vonds Ichihara players